Darlings Beach is a hamlet in Rural Municipality of Lac Pelletier No. 107, Saskatchewan, Canada. Listed as a designated place by Statistics Canada, the hamlet had a population of 0 in the Canada 2011 Census. The hamlet is located on the eastern shore of Lac Pelletier, within the Lac Pelletier Regional Park.

Demographics

See also 
 List of communities in Saskatchewan
 Hamlets of Saskatchewan
 Designated place

References 

Lac Pelletier No. 107, Saskatchewan
Former designated places in Saskatchewan
Organized hamlets in Saskatchewan
Division No. 4, Saskatchewan